Lehri may refer to:

People 
 Lehri (tribe), a Baloch tribe of the Balochistan province of Pakistan
 Lehri (actor) (1929–2012), Pakistani film actor
 Sunil Lahri, Indian actor

Places 
 Lehri, Balochistan, a town and union council in the Sibi District in the Balochistan province of Pakistan
Lehri District
 Lehri, Morocco a commune of the Khenifra Province
 Lehri, Jhelum, a village and union council in the Jhelum District in the Punjab province of Pakistan

See also 
 Battle of El Herri, or Lehri, a 1914 military conflict between Zayan tribes and French invading forces